This article details the Warrington Wolves Rugby League Football Club's 2012 season. This is the clubs seventeenth season of the Super League era. Warrington Wolves won their eighth Challenge Cup with a 35-18 win against Leeds Rhinos in the final.

Pre-season

2012 Super League XVII play-offs fixtures and results

2012 Carnegie Challenge Cup fixtures and results

2012 squad
Released November 2011.

2012 transfers in/out

In

Out

References

Warrington Wolves seasons
Warrington Wolves